Froyle is a village and civil parish in the East Hampshire district of Hampshire, England. It is 3.6 miles (5.8 km) northeast of Alton. The nearest railway station is 2 miles (3.3 km) east of the village, at Bentley. According to the 2011 census, the parish had a population of 644 people. The village is divided into Upper Froyle, centred around the Church and Manor House, and Lower Froyle which grew up around the farms.

History
Froyle is situated on the edge of The Downs above the Pilgrims' Way that leads from Winchester to Canterbury. It is most likely that, in the winter months, the actual route taken by Pilgrims passed through the village to avoid the wet conditions in the valley of the River Wey. There was a Church at "Froli" (mentioned in the Domesday Book) in 1086. The entry for Froyle also states "Froyle, it was ever there...." and there are traces of habitation on the surrounding downs going back to the Iron Age.

It is also known by some who live there as the 'village of the saints' because of the 19 statues of saints in niches on the front walls of houses and other buildings in Upper Froyle. They were bought by Sir Hubert Miller in the early 20th century from Italy.

Notable people
Sir John Jephson, MP  and Irish Privy councillor (died 1638), Lord of the  Manor  of  Froyle,  and his son  William Jephson (died 1658), politician  and confidant  of Oliver Cromwell. 
Rev. Sir Thomas Miller, 6th Baronet: he was both the vicar and the lord of the manor of Froyle. His grandson, Sir Hubert Miller, said of him "My grandfather hunted hard to hounds and drank two bottles of port with his dinner. I wonder he wasn’t sick." It was also reported that on hot Sunday mornings Miller would smash the church windows with his walking stick to let air in, although this is thought likely to be apocryphal.
Sir Henry John Miller (1830-1918), emigrated to New Zealand and became Speaker of the New Zealand Legislative Council.

Further reading 
 Froyle, 100 Years of Memories 
 Annette Booth and Nora Jupe A Village School

References

External links

 Froyle Parish Council
 Froyle Parish Council History (Page 1 of 9)
 Welcome to Froyle
 Froyle Promotions
 The Froyle Archive
 Christopher Hussey’s Froyle Part 1
 Christopher Hussey’s Froyle Part 2
 Froyle Village Hall
 Froyle
 The Church of St Mary of the Assumption, Froyle
 Hampshire Treasures Volume 6 (East Hampshire) Page 147 - Froyle
 Hampshire Treasures Volume 6 (East Hampshire) Page 149 - Froyle
 Hampshire Treasures Volume 6 (East Hampshire) Page 150 - Froyle
 Hampshire Treasures Volume 6 (East Hampshire) Page 151 - Froyle
 Hampshire Treasures Volume 6 (East Hampshire) Page 152 - Froyle
 Hampshire Treasures Volume 6 (East Hampshire) Page 153 - Froyle
 Hampshire Treasures Volume 6 (East Hampshire) Page 154 - Froyle
 The Hen and Chicken
 The Anchor Inn

Villages in Hampshire